A LAN Gaming Center is a business where one 
can use a computer connected over a LAN to 
other computers, primarily for the purpose of playing multiplayer 
computer games. Use of these computers or game consoles costs a fee, usually per hour or minute; sometimes one can have unmetered access with a pass for a day or month, etc. It may or may not serve as a 
regular café as well, with food and drinks being served. Many game 
centers have evolved in recent years to also include console gaming 
(Xbox, GameCube, PlayStation 2).  Other 
centers offer computer repair and consulting, custom 
built computers (White box computer), web design, programming 
classes or summer camps, and many other technology related 
services. Centers are starting to offer PS3s, Wiis and 
Xbox 360s that are playable in store.

LAN gaming centers can come in various sizes and styles, from the 
very small (6-8 computers) to the very large (400+ computers).  Most 
have computer systems with higher-end hardware built specifically for 
computer gaming.  Customers can play games with (or against) in-house 
opponents and most also include a high-speed Internet 
connection to allow customers to play games with online opponents as 
well (usually at the same time).  Most also host a number of special 
events such as tournaments and LAN parties, some 
lasting throughout the night.  Another typical feature is the ability to browse the Web and use instant messaging clients.  Often these gaming centers allow customers the option of 
renting out the whole or part of the store for private LAN parties. LAN 
centers are typically decorated in such a way as to enhance the already 
present gaming atmosphere, such as adding black-light lightbulbs and 
gaming paraphernalia and posters around the center. A standard LAN 
gaming center will have rows of computers next to each other with 
highback leather computer chairs.

There are over 650 LAN centers in the US, while 90% of the LAN Centers 
in the world are in China, the largest having over 1777 
seats.

It is common for a LAN gaming centers to sell the games that they had already installed for their in-house computers, most notably MMORPGs and many FPS games.

Campus gaming centers 

The first LAN Gaming center located on a college campus was Savage 
Geckos which was opened by Bruce McCulloch Jones as a tenant of 
Eastern Michigan University's Student Center, both opening on 
November 6, 2006. The combination 
retail/gaming center included 21 networked Xboxs, other consoles: PS2s, 
PS3s, Wiis, 10 networked gaming PCs and theatre seating (with cup 
holders) for game play, LCD screens, video projectors and a 
retail/arcade/hang out area.   This center hosted some of the first 
on-campus intercollegiate play with a Halo 3 tournament between 
students from Eastern Michigan University, University of Michigan, 
Michigan State University and Oakland University.  
The operation lasted until Spring of 2008 when it was purchased by the 
university. Mr. Jones made a series of presentations to the Association of College 
Unions International  promoting the use of video games for positive 
social interaction on campus student centers. Now there are over 20 universities with some form of LAN Center on campus including Eastern Michigan University, University of Michigan, Oakland University, 
Illinois State University, and Illinois Institute of Technology.

See also
 PC bang
 Internet café
 Public computer

References

External links 

Video game culture
LAN parties